Aqua Line of the Pune Metro is the second line of the city's mass transit network. It will run from Ramwadi to Vanaz via Mangalwar Peth and Deccan Gymkhana.

Route 
It will connect with the Purple Line and Line 3 at the Civil Court interchange station. The maintenance depot for the Aqua Line will be located near the Vanaz station on the former garbage depot land.

List of stations 
Following is a list of stations on this route-

References 

Pune Metro lines